Mauna Kea ( or ; ; abbreviation for Mauna a Wākea) is a dormant volcano on the island of Hawaii. The peak is about  higher than Mauna Loa, its more massive neighbor.

It is about one million years old and thus passed the most active shield stage of life hundreds of thousands of years ago. In its current post-shield state, its lava is more viscous, resulting in a steeper profile. Late volcanism has also given it a much rougher appearance than its neighboring volcanoes due to construction of cinder cones, decentralization of its rift zones, glaciation on its peak, and weathering by the prevailing trade winds. Mauna Kea last erupted 6,000 to 4,000 years ago and is now thought to be dormant.

In Hawaiian religion, the peaks of the island of Hawaii are sacred. An ancient law allowed only high-ranking aliʻi to visit its peak. Ancient Hawaiians living on the slopes of Mauna Kea relied on its extensive forests for food, and quarried the dense volcano-glacial basalts on its flanks for tool production. When Europeans arrived in the late 18th century, settlers introduced cattle, sheep and game animals, many of which became feral and began to damage the volcano's ecological balance. Mauna Kea can be ecologically divided into three sections: an alpine climate at its summit, a Sophora chrysophylla–Myoporum sandwicense (or māmane–naio) forest on its flanks, and an Acacia koa–Metrosideros polymorpha (or koa–ōhia) forest, now mostly cleared by the former sugar industry, at its base. In recent years, concern over the vulnerability of the native species has led to court cases that have forced the Hawaii Department of Land and Natural Resources to work towards eradicating all feral species on the volcano.

With its high elevation, dry environment, and stable airflow, Mauna Kea's summit is one of the best sites in the world for astronomical observation. Since the creation of an access road in 1964, thirteen telescopes funded by eleven countries have been constructed at the summit. The Mauna Kea Observatories are used for scientific research across the electromagnetic spectrum and comprise the largest such facility in the world. Their construction on a landscape considered sacred by Native Hawaiians continues to be a topic of debate to this day.

Topographic prominence

Mauna Kea is unusually topographically prominent for its height, with a wet prominence fifteenth in the world among mountains, and a dry prominence second in the world, after only Mount Everest.

Given how much Mauna Kea protrudes from the Hawaiian Trough, some authorities have called it the tallest (as opposed to highest) mountain in the world, as measured from base to peak. On those examples, other mountains stake rivaling claims, such as Mount Lamlam claiming higher climb from base (starting from Challenger Deep), and all of the Himalayan Mountains claiming tremendously deep roots. Neither Mount Lamlam nor Llullaillaco have the dry prominence of Mauna Kea, because they do not extend into trenches in every direction.

Geology

Mauna Kea is one of five volcanoes that form the island of Hawaii, the largest and youngest island of the Hawaiian–Emperor seamount chain. Of these five hotspot volcanoes, Mauna Kea is the fourth oldest and fourth most active. It began as a preshield volcano driven by the Hawaii hotspot around one million years ago, and became exceptionally active during its shield stage until 500,000 years ago. Mauna Kea entered its quieter post-shield stage 250,000 to 200,000 years ago, and is currently dormant. Mauna Kea does not have a visible summit caldera, but contains a number of small cinder and pumice cones near its summit. A former summit caldera may have been filled and buried by later summit eruption deposits.

Much of its mass lies east of its present summit.

Like all Hawaiian volcanoes, Mauna Kea has been created as the Pacific tectonic plate has moved over the Hawaiian hotspot in the Earth's underlying mantle. The Hawaii island volcanoes are the most recent evidence of this process that, over 70 million years, has created the -long Hawaiian Ridge–Emperor seamount chain. The prevailing, though not completely settled, view is that the hotspot has been largely stationary within the planet's mantle for much, if not all of the Cenozoic Era. However, while Hawaiian volcanism is well understood and extensively studied, there remains no definite explanation of the mechanism that causes the hotspot effect.

Lava flows from Mauna Kea overlapped in complex layers with those of its neighbors during its growth. Most prominently, Mauna Kea is built upon older flows from Kohala to the northwest, and intersects the base of Mauna Loa to the south. The original eruptive fissures (rift zones) in the flanks of Mauna Kea were buried by its post-shield volcanism. Hilo Ridge, a prominent underwater rift zone structure east of Mauna Kea, was once believed to be a part of the volcano; however, it is now understood to be a rift zone of Kohala that has been affected by younger Mauna Kea flows.

The shield-stage lavas that built the enormous main mass of the volcano are tholeiitic basalts, like those of Mauna Loa, created through the mixing of primary magma and subducted oceanic crust. They are covered by the oldest exposed rock strata on Mauna Kea, the post-shield alkali basalts of the Hāmākua Volcanics, which erupted between 250,000 and 70–65,000 years ago. The most recent volcanic flows are hawaiites and mugearites: they are the post-shield Laupāhoehoe Volcanics, erupted between 65,000 and 4,000 years ago. These changes in lava composition accompanied the slow reduction of the supply of magma to the summit, which led to weaker eruptions that then gave way to isolated episodes associated with volcanic dormancy. The Laupāhoehoe lavas are more viscous and contain more volatiles than the earlier tholeiitic basalts; their thicker flows significantly steepened Mauna Kea's flanks. In addition, explosive eruptions have built cinder cones near the summit. These cones are the most recent eruptive centers of Mauna Kea.

Mauna Kea is the only Hawaiian volcano with distinct evidence of glaciation. Similar deposits probably existed on Mauna Loa, but have been covered by later lava flows. Despite Hawaii's tropical location, during several past ice ages a drop of a degree in temperature allowed snow to remain at the volcano's summit through summer, triggering the formation of an ice cap. There are three episodes of glaciation that have been recorded from the last 180,000 years: the Pōhakuloa (180–130 ka), Wāihu (80–60 ka) and Mākanaka (40–13 ka) series. These have extensively sculpted the summit, depositing moraines and a circular ring of till and gravel along the volcano's upper flanks. Subglacial eruptions built cinder cones during the Mākanaka glaciation, most of which were heavily gouged by glacial action. The most recent cones were built between 9000 and 4500 years ago, atop the glacial deposits, although one study indicates that the last eruption may have been around 3600 years ago.

Small gullies etch the summit, formed by rain- and snow-fed streams that flow only during winter melt and rain showers.
On the windward side of the volcano, stream erosion driven by trade winds has accelerated erosion in a manner similar to that on older Kohala.

Mauna Kea is home to Lake Waiau, the highest lake in the Pacific Basin. Radiocarbon dating of samples at the base of the lake indicates that it was clear of ice 12,600 years ago. Hawaiian lava types are typically permeable, preventing lake formation due to infiltration. Either sulfur-bearing steam altered the volcanic ash to low-permeability clays, or explosive interactions between rising magma and groundwater or surface water during phreatic eruptions formed exceptionally fine ash that reduced the permeability of the lake bed.

The borehole had drilled through a compacted layer of soil and lava where the flows of Mauna Loa had encroached upon the exposed Mauna Kea surface and had subsequently been subsided below sea level. The aquifer's presence is attributed to a freshwater head within Mauna Kea's basal lens. Scientists believe there may be more water in Mauna Kea's freshwater lens than current models may indicate. Two more boreholes were drilled on Mauna Kea in 2012, with water being found at much higher elevations and shallower depths than expected. Donald Thomas, director of the University of Hawaii's Center for the Study of Active Volcanoes believes one reason to continue study of the aquifers is due to use and occupancy of the higher elevation areas, stating: "Nearly all of these activities depend on the availability of potable water that, in most cases, must be trucked to the Saddle from Waimea or Hilo — an inefficient and expensive process that consumes a substantial quantity of our scarce liquid fuels."

Future activity
The last eruption of Mauna Kea was about 4,600 years ago (about 2600 BC); because of this inactivity, Mauna Kea is assigned a United States Geological Survey hazard listing of 7 for its summit and 8 for its lower flanks, out of the lowest possible hazard rating of 9 (which is given to the extinct volcano Kohala). Since 8000 BC lava flows have covered 20% of the volcano's summit and virtually none of its flanks.

Despite its dormancy, Mauna Kea is expected to erupt again. Long periods of activity could build a cinder cone at the source. Although not likely in the next few centuries, such an eruption would probably result in little loss of life but significant damage to infrastructure.

Human history

Native history

The first Ancient Hawaiians to arrive on Hawaii island lived along the shores, where food and water were plentiful. Settlement expanded inland to the Mauna Loa – Mauna Kea region in the 12th and early 13th centuries. Archaeological evidence suggests that these regions were used for hunting, collecting stone material, and possibly for spiritual reasons or for astronomical or navigational observations. The mountain's plentiful forest provided plants and animals for food and raw materials for shelter. Flightless birds that had previously known no predators became a staple food source.

Early settlement of the Hawaiian islands led to major changes to local ecosystems and many extinctions, particularly amongst bird species. Ancient Hawaiians brought foreign plants and animals, and their arrival was associated with increased rates of erosion.
The prevailing lowland forest ecosystem was transformed from forest to grassland; some of this change was caused by the use of fire, but the prevailing cause of forest ecosystem collapse and avian extinction on Hawaii appears to have been the introduction of the Polynesian (or Pacific) rat.

The five volcanoes of Hawaii are revered as sacred mountains; and Mauna Kea's summit, the highest, is the most sacred. For this reason, a kapu (ancient Hawaiian law) restricted visitor rights to high-ranking aliʻi. Hawaiians associated elements of their natural environment with particular deities. In Hawaiian mythology, the summit of Mauna Kea was seen as the "region of the gods", a place where benevolent spirits reside. Poliahu, deity of snow, also resides there. "Mauna Kea" is an abbreviation for Mauna a Wākea and means "white mountain," in reference to its seasonally snow-capped summit.

Around AD 1100, natives established adze quarries high up on Mauna Kea to extract the uniquely dense basalt (generated by the quick cooling of lava flows meeting glacial ice during subglacial eruptions) to make tools. Volcanic glass and gabbro were collected for blades and fishing gear, and māmane wood was preferred for the handles. At peak quarry activity after AD 1400, there were separate facilities for rough and fine cutting; shelters with food, water, and wood to sustain the workers; and workshops creating the finished product.

Lake Waiau provided drinking water for the workers. Native chiefs would also dip the umbilical cords of newborn babies in its water, to give them the strength of the mountain. Use of the quarry declined between this period and contact with Americans and Europeans. As part of the ritual associated with quarrying, the workers erected shrines to their gods; these and other quarry artifacts remain at the sites, most of which lie within what is now the Mauna Kea Ice Age Reserve.

This early era was followed by cultural expansion between the 12th and late 18th century. Land was divided into regions designed for the immediate needs of the populace. These ahupuaa generally took the form of long strips of land oriented from the mountain summits to the coast. Mauna Kea's summit was encompassed in the ahupuaa of Kaohe, with part of its eastern slope reaching into the nearby Humuula. Principal sources of nutrition for Hawaiians living on the slopes of the volcano came from the māmane–naio forest of its upper slopes, which provided them with vegetation and bird life. Bird species hunted included the uau (Pterodroma sandwichensis), nēnē (Branta sandvicensis), and palila (Loxioides bailleui). The lower koa–ōhia forest gave the natives wood for canoes and ornate bird feathers for decoration.

Modern era

There are three accounts of foreigners visiting Hawaii before the arrival of James Cook, in 1778. However, the earliest Western depictions of the isle, including Mauna Kea, were created by explorers in the late 18th and early 19th centuries. Contact with Europe and America had major consequences for island residents. Native Hawaiians were devastated by introduced diseases; port cities including Hilo, Kealakekua, and Kailua grew with the establishment of trade; and the adze quarries on Mauna Kea were abandoned after the introduction of metal tools.

In 1793, cattle were brought by George Vancouver as a tribute to King Kamehameha I. By the early 19th century, they had escaped confinement and roamed the island freely, greatly damaging its ecosystem. In 1809 John Palmer Parker arrived and befriended Kamehameha I, who put him in charge of cattle management on the island. With an additional land grant in 1845, Parker established Parker Ranch on the northern slope of Mauna Kea, a large cattle ranch that is still in operation today. Settlers to the island burned and cut down much of the lower native forest for sugarcane plantations and houses.

The Saddle Road, named for its crossing of the saddle-shaped plateau between Mauna Kea and Mauna Loa, was completed in 1943, and eased travel to Mauna Kea considerably.

The Pohakuloa Training Area on the plateau is the largest military training ground in Hawaii. The  base extends from the volcano's lower flanks to  elevation, on state land leased to the US Army since 1956. There are 15 threatened and endangered plants, three endangered birds, and one endangered bat species in the area.

Mauna Kea has been the site of extensive archaeological research since the 1980s. Approximately 27 percent of the Science Reserve had been surveyed by 2000, identifying 76 shrines, 4 adze manufacturing workshops, 3 other markers, 1 positively identified burial site, and 4 possible burial sites. By 2009, the total number of identified sites had risen to 223, and archaeological research on the volcano's upper flanks is ongoing. It has been suggested that the shrines, which are arranged around the volcano's summit along what may be an ancient snow line, are markers for the transition to the sacred part of Mauna Kea. Despite many references to burial around Mauna Kea in Hawaiian oral history, few sites have been confirmed. The lack of shrines or other artifacts on the many cinder cones dotting the volcano may be because they were reserved for burial.

Ascents

In pre-contact times, natives traveling up Mauna Kea were probably guided more by landscape than by existing trails, as no evidence of trails has been found. It is possible that natural ridges and water sources were followed instead. Individuals likely took trips up Mauna Kea's slopes to visit family-maintained shrines near its summit, and traditions related to ascending the mountain exist to this day. However, very few natives reached the summit, because of the strict kapu placed on it.

In the early 19th century, the earliest notable recorded ascents of Mauna Kea included the following:
On August 26, 1823, Joseph F. Goodrich, an American missionary, made the first recorded ascent in a single day; however, a small arrangement of stones he observed suggested he was not the first human on the summit. He recorded four ecosystems as he travelled from base to summit, and also visited Lake Waiau.
On June 17, 1825, an expedition from HMS Blonde, led by botanist James Macrae, reached the summit of Mauna Kea. Macrae was the first person to record the Mauna Kea silversword (Argyroxiphium sandwicense), saying: "The last mile was destitute of vegetation except one plant of the Sygenisia tribe, in growth much like a Yucca, with sharp pointed silver coloured leaves and green upright spike of three or four feet producing pendulous branches with brown flowers, truly superb, and almost worth the journey of coming here to see it on purpose."
In January 1834, David Douglas climbed the mountain and described extensively the division of plant species by altitude. On an unrelated traverse, from Kamuela to Hilo in July, he was found dead in a pit intended to catch wild cattle. Although murder was suspected, it was probably an accidental fall. The site, Ka lua kauka , is marked by the Douglas fir trees named for him.
In 1881, Queen Emma traveled to the peak to bathe in the waters of Lake Waiau during competition for the role of ruling chief of the Kingdom of Hawaii.
On August 6, 1889, E.D. Baldwin left Hilo and followed cattle trails to the summit.
In February 2021, Victor Vescovo and Clifford Kapono made the first ascent of Mauna Kea from its subaerial base 16,785 ft below sea level using the submersible Limiting Factor, then ocean kayaks from above the mountain base 27 miles to the shoreline, then bicycles to a camp at about 9000 ft altitude from which they then walked to the 13,802 ft summit (a total gain of 30,587 ft).

In the late 19th and early 20th centuries trails were formed, often by the movement of game herds, that could be traveled on horseback. However, vehicular access to the summit was practically impossible until the construction of a road in 1964, and it continues to be restricted. Today, multiple trails to the summit exist, in various states of use.

Ecology

Background
Hawaii's geographical isolation strongly influences its ecology. Remote islands like Hawaii have a large number of species that are found nowhere else (see Endemism in the Hawaiian Islands). The remoteness resulted in evolutionary lines distinct from those elsewhere and isolated these endemic species from external biotic influence, and also makes them especially vulnerable to extinction and the effects of invasive species. In addition the ecosystems of Hawaii are under threat from human development including the clearing of land for agriculture; an estimated third of the island's endemic species have already been wiped out. Because of its elevation, Mauna Kea has the greatest diversity of biotic ecosystems anywhere in the Hawaiian archipelago. Ecosystems on the mountain form concentric rings along its slopes due to changes in temperature and precipitation with elevation. These ecosystems can be roughly divided into three sections by elevation: alpine–subalpine, montane, and basal forest.

Contact with Americans and Europeans in the early 19th century brought more settlers to the island, and had a lasting negative ecological effect. On lower slopes, vast tracts of koa–ōhia forest were converted to farmland. Higher up, feral animals that escaped from ranches found refuge in, and damaged extensively, Mauna Kea's native māmane–naio forest. Non-native plants are the other serious threat; there are over 4,600 introduced species on the island, whereas the number of native species is estimated at just 1,000.

Alpine environment

The summit of Mauna Kea lies above the tree line, and consists of mostly lava rock and alpine tundra. An area of heavy snowfall, it is inhospitable to vegetation, and is known as the Hawaiian tropical high shrublands. Growth is restricted here by extremely cold temperatures, a short growing season, low rainfall, and snow during winter months. A lack of soil also retards root growth, makes it difficult to absorb nutrients from the ground, and gives the area a very low water retention capacity.

Plant species found at this elevation include Styphelia tameiameiae, Taraxacum officinale, Tetramolopium humile, Agrostis sandwicensis, Anthoxanthum odoratum, Trisetum glomeratum, Poa annua, Sonchus oleraceus, and Coprosma ernodiodes. One notable species is Mauna Kea silversword (Argyroxiphium sandwicense var. sandwicense), a highly endangered endemic plant species that thrives in Mauna Kea's high elevation cinder deserts. At one stage reduced to a population of just 50 plants, Mauna Kea silversword was thought to be restricted to the alpine zone, but in fact has been driven there by pressure from livestock, and can grow at lower elevations as well.

The Mauna Kea Ice Age Reserve on the southern summit flank of Mauna Kea was established in 1981. The reserve is a region of sparsely vegetated cinder deposits and lava rock, including areas of aeolian desert and Lake Waiau. This ecosystem is a likely haven for the threatened uau (Pterodroma sandwichensis) and also the center of a study on wēkiu bugs (Nysius wekiuicola).

Wēkiu bugs feed on dead insect carcasses that drift up Mauna Kea on the wind and settle on snow banks. This is a highly unusual food source for a species in the genus Nysius, which consists of predominantly seed-eating insects. They can survive at extreme elevations of up to  because of natural antifreeze in their blood. They also stay under heated surfaces most of the time. Their conservation status is unclear, but the species is no longer a candidate for the Endangered Species List; studies on the welfare of the species began in 1980. The closely related Nysius aa lives on Mauna Loa. Wolf spiders (Lycosidae) and forest tent caterpillar moths have also been observed in the same Mauna Kea ecosystem; the former survive by hiding under heat-absorbing rocks, and the latter through cold-resistant chemicals in their bodies.

Māmane–naio forest

Māmane seeds and naio fruit are the chief foods of the birds in this zone, especially the palila (Loxioides bailleui). The palila was formerly found on the slopes of Mauna Kea, Mauna Loa, and Hualālai, but is now confined to the slopes of Mauna Kea—only 10% of its former range—and has been declared critically endangered.

The largest threat to the ecosystem is grazing by feral sheep, cattle (Bos primigenius), and goats (Capra hircus) introduced to the island in the late 18th century. Feral animal competition with commercial grazing was severe enough that a program to eradicate them existed as far back as the late 1920s, and continued through to 1949. One of the results of this grazing was the increased prevalence of herbaceous and woody plants, both endemic and introduced, that were resistant to browsing. The feral animals were almost eradicated, and numbered a few hundred in the 1950s. However, an influx of local hunters led to the feral species being valued as game animals, and in 1959 the Hawaii Department of Land and Natural Resources, the governing body in charge of conservation and land use management, changed its policy to a sustained-control program designed to facilitate the sport.

Mouflon (Ovis aries orientalis) was introduced from 1962 to 1964, and a plan to release axis deer (Axis axis) in 1964 was prevented only by protests from the ranching industry, who said that they would damage crops and spread disease. The hunting industry fought back, and the back-and-forth between the ranchers and hunters eventually gave way to a rise in public environmental concern. With the development of astronomical facilities on Mauna Kea commencing, conservationists demanded protection of Mauna Kea's ecosystem. A plan was proposed to fence 25% of the forests for protection, and manage the remaining 75% for game hunting. Despite opposition from conservationists the plan was put into action. While the land was partitioned no money was allocated for the building of the fence. In the midst of this wrangling the Endangered Species Act was passed; the National Audubon Society and Sierra Club Legal Defense Fund filed a lawsuit against the Hawaii Department of Land and Natural Resources, claiming that they were violating federal law, in the landmark case Palila v. Hawaii Department of Land and Natural Resources (1978).

The court ruled in favor of conservationists and upheld the precedence of federal laws before state control of wildlife. Having violated the Endangered Species Act, Hawaii state was required to remove all feral animals from the mountainside. This decision was followed by a second court order in 1981. A public hunting program removed many of the feral animals, at least temporarily. An active control program is in place, though it is not conducted with sufficient rigor to allow significant recovery of the māmane-naio ecosystem. There are many other species and ecosystems on the island, and on Mauna Kea, that remain threatened by human development and invasive species.

The Mauna Kea Forest Reserve protects  of māmane-naio forest under the jurisdiction of the Hawaii Department of Land and Natural Resources. Ungulate hunting is allowed year-round. A small part of the māmane–naio forest is encompassed by the Mauna Kea State Recreation Area.

Lower environment

A band of ranch land on Mauna Kea's lower slopes was formerly Acacia koa – Metrosideros polymorpha (koa-ōhia) forest. Its destruction was driven by an influx of European and American settlers in the early 19th century, as extensive logging during the 1830s provided lumber for new homes. Vast swathes of the forest were burned and cleared for sugarcane plantations. Most of the houses on the island were built of koa, and those parts of the forest that survived became a source for firewood to power boilers on the sugarcane plantations and to heat homes. The once vast forest had almost disappeared by 1880, and by 1900, logging interests had shifted to Kona and the island of Maui. With the collapse of the sugar industry in the 1990s, much of this land lies fallow but portions are used for cattle grazing, small-scale farming and the cultivation of eucalyptus for wood pulp.

The Hakalau Forest National Wildlife Refuge is a major koa forest reserve on Mauna Kea's windward slope. It was established in 1985, covering  of ecosystem remnant. Eight endangered bird species, twelve endangered plants, and the endangered Hawaiian hoary bat (Lasiurus cinereus semotus) have been observed in the area, in addition to many other rare biota. The reserve has been the site of an extensive replanting campaign since 1989. Parts of the reserve show the effect of agriculture on the native ecosystem, as much of the land in the upper part of the reserve is abandoned farmland.

Bird species native to the acacia koa–ōhia forest include the Hawaiian crow (Corvus hawaiiensis), the akepa (Loxops coccineus), Hawaii creeper (Oreomystis mana), ʻakiapōlāʻau (Hemignathus munroi), and Hawaiian hawk (Buteo solitarius), all of which are endangered, threatened, or near threatened; the Hawaiian crow in particular is extinct in the wild, but there are plans to reintroduce the species into the Hakalau reserve.

Summit observatories

Mauna Kea's summit is one of the best sites in the world for astronomical observation due to favorable observing conditions. The arid conditions are important for submillimeter and infrared astronomy for this region of the electromagnetic spectrum. The summit is above the inversion layer, keeping most cloud cover below the summit and ensuring the air on the summit is dry, and free of atmospheric pollution. The summit atmosphere is exceptionally stable, lacking turbulence for some of the world's best astronomical seeing. The very dark skies resulting from Mauna Kea's distance from city lights are preserved by legislation that minimizes light pollution from the surrounding area; the darkness level allows the observation of faint astronomical objects. These factors historically made Mauna Kea an excellent spot for stargazing.

In the early 1960s, the Hawaii Island Chamber of Commerce encouraged astronomical development of Mauna Kea, as economic stimulus; this coincided with University of Arizona astronomer Gerard Kuiper's search for sites to use newly improved detectors of infrared light. Site testing by Kuiper's assistant Alika Herring in 1964 confirmed the summit's outstanding suitability. An intense three-way competition for NASA funds to construct a large telescope began between Kuiper, Harvard University, and the University of Hawaii (UH), which only had experience in solar astronomy. This culminated in funds being awarded to the "upstart" UH proposal. UH rebuilt its small astronomy department into a new Institute for Astronomy, and in 1968 the Hawaii Department of Land and Natural Resources gave it a 65-year lease for all land within a  radius of its telescope, essentially that above . On its completion in 1970, the UH  was the seventh largest optical/infrared telescope in the world.

By 1970, two  telescopes had been constructed by the US Air Force and Lowell Observatory. In 1973, Canada and France agreed to build the 3.6 m CFHT on Mauna Kea. However, local organisations started to raise concerns about the environmental impact of the observatory. This led the Department of Land and Natural Resources to prepare an initial management plan, drafted in 1977 and supplemented in 1980. In January 1982, the UH Board of Regents approved a plan to support the continued development of scientific facilities at the site. In 1998,  were transferred from the observatory lease to supplement the Mauna Kea Ice Age Reserve. The 1982 plan was replaced in 2000 by an extension designed to serve until 2020: it instituted an Office of Mauna Kea Management, designated  for astronomy, and shifted the remaining  to "natural and cultural preservation". This plan was further revised to address concern expressed in the Hawaiian community that a lack of respect was being shown toward the cultural values of the mountain.

Today the Mauna Kea Science Reserve has 13 observation facilities, each funded by as many as 11 countries. In comparison, the Hubble Space Telescope has a  mirror, similar in size to the UH88, now the second smallest telescope on the mountain.

A "Save Mauna Kea" movement believes development of the mountain to be sacrilegious. Native Hawaiian non-profit groups such as Kahea, concerned with cultural heritage and the environment, also oppose development for cultural and religious reasons. The multi-telescope "outrigger" proposed in 2006 was eventually canceled. A planned new telescope, the Thirty Meter Telescope (TMT), has attracted controversy and protests. The TMT was approved in April 2013. In October 2014, the groundbreaking ceremony for the telescope was interrupted by protesters causing the project to temporarily halt. In late March 2015, demonstrators blocked access of the road to the summit again. On April 2, 2015, 300 protestors were gathered near the visitor's center when 12 people were arrested with 11 more arrested at the summit. Among the concerns of the protest groups are the land appraisals and Native Hawaiians consultation. Construction was halted on April 7, 2015, after protests expanded over the state. After several halts, the project has been voluntarily postponed. Governor Ige announced substantial changes to the management of Mauna Kea in the future but stated the project can move forward. The Supreme Court of Hawaii approved the resumption of construction on October 31, 2018. Protestors have posted online petitions as a reaction against the Thirty Meter Telescope. The online petition titled "The Immediate Halt to the Construction of the TMT Telescope" was posted to Change.org on July 14, 2019. The online petition has currently gathered over 278,057 signatures worldwide. Some protesters have also called for the impeachment of Hawaiian Governor David Ige because of his support for the Thirty Meter Telescope. On July 18, 2019, an online petition titled "Impeach Governor David Ige" had been posted to Change.org and has currently gathered over 62,562 signatures.

As of late 2021 construction plans are currently on hold due to the ongoing effects of the COVID-19 pandemic and a shift in funding for the project that may see federal funds made available through the National Science Foundation. The controversy surrounding construction of the Thirty Meter Telescope continues. Independent polls commissioned by local media organizations show consistent support for the project in the islands with over two thirds of local residents supporting the project. These same polls indicate Native Hawaiian community support remains split with about half of Hawaiian respondents supporting construction of the new telescope.

A July, 2022, state law responds to the protests by shifting control over the master land lease from the University of Hawaii to the new Mauna Kea Stewardship and Oversight Authority (MKSOA). The MKSOA is a 12 member board (11 voting members and 1 non-voting member) which includes representatives from the university, astronomers and native Hawaiians and it was created with the aim of finding a balance between the conflicting interests of astronomers and native Hawaiians. It is placed within the Hawaii department of land and natural resources and will be the principal authority for the management of state-managed lands within the Mauna Kea lands after a 5 year transition period from the university starting on July 1, 2023. During the transition period, the MKSOA and the university will jointly manage the land while the authority develops a management plan to govern land uses, human activities, and overall operations. Once the transition period is up in 2028, the authority's responsibilities will include issuing new land use permits which will be important as the current master lease ends in 2033, and any observatories which don't come up with new leases by the time of its expiration will be decommissioned.

Climate

Mauna Kea has an alpine climate (ET). Due to the influence of its tropical latitude, temperature swings are very low. Frosts are common year round, but the average monthly temperature remains above freezing throughout the year.

A weather station was operated from 1972 to 1982; however, only 33 months within this period have temperature records; many years only have data for two months. The temperatures presented below are smoothed averages, not the raw numbers recorded by NOAA.

Recreation

Mauna Kea's coastline is dominated by the Hamakua Coast, an area of rugged terrain created by frequent slumps and landslides on the volcano's flank. The area includes several recreation parks including Kalopa State Recreation Area, Wailuku River State Park and Akaka Falls State Park.

There are over 3,000 registered hunters on Hawaii island, and hunting, for both recreation and sustenance, is a common activity on Mauna Kea. A public hunting program is used to control the numbers of introduced animals including pigs, sheep, goats, turkey, pheasants, and quail. The Mauna Kea State Recreation Area functions as a base camp for the sport. Birdwatching is also common at lower levels on the mountain. A popular site is Kīpuka Puu Huluhulu, a kīpuka on Mauna Kea's flank that formed when lava flows isolated the forest on a hill.

Mauna Kea's great height and the steepness of its flanks provide a better view and a shorter hike than the adjacent Mauna Loa. The height with its risk of altitude sickness, weather concerns, steep road grade, and overall inaccessibility make the volcano dangerous and summit trips difficult. Until the construction of roads in the mid-20th century, only the hardy visited Mauna Kea's upper slopes; hunters tracked game animals, and hikers traveled up the mountain. These travelers used stone cabins constructed by the Civilian Conservation Corps in the 1930s as base camps, and it is from these facilities that the modern mid-level Onizuka Center for International Astronomy telescope support complex is derived. The first Mauna Kea summit road was built in 1964, making the peak accessible to more people.

Today, multiple hiking trails exist, including the Mauna Kea Trail, and by 2007 over 100,000 tourists and 32,000 vehicles were going each year to the Visitor Information Station (VIS) adjacent to the Onizuka Center for International Astronomy. One study reported that around a third of visitors and two thirds of professional astronomers working on the mountain have experienced symptoms of acute altitude sickness; visitors traveling up the volcano's flanks are advised to stop for at least half an hour and preferably longer at the visitor center to acclimate to the higher elevation. It is strongly recommended to use a four-wheel drive vehicle to drive all the way to the top. Brakes often overheat on the way down and there is no fuel available on Mauna Kea. A free Star Gazing Program was previously held at the VIS every night from 6-10 pm, with the program canceled due to both a change in operating hours and closure due to the ongoing COVID-19 pandemic. Between 5,000 and 6,000 people visit the summit of Mauna Kea each year, and to help ensure safety, and protect the integrity of the mountain, a ranger program was implemented in 2001.

See also

List of mountain peaks of the United States
List of volcanoes of the United States
List of mountain peaks of Hawaii
List of the highest major summits of the United States
List of the most prominent summits of the United States
List of the most isolated major summits of the United States
List of Ultras of Oceania
Evolution of Hawaiian volcanoes
List of tallest mountains in the Solar System
Mount Everest

Footnotes

References

Further reading
Ciotti, Joseph E. "Historical Views of Mauna Kea: From the Vantage Points of Hawaiian Culture and Astronomical Research," Hawaiian Journal of History, 45 (2011), 147–66.

External links

Geology
http://hvo.wr.usgs.gov/volcanoes/maunakea/ 
Mauna Kea Summary — Global Volcanism Program
Mauna Kea. Hawaii Center for Volcanology.
Astronomy and culture
Mauna Kea Observatories. Tour of Mauna Kea's summit facilities.
Mauna Kea Visitor Information. Information pertaining to visiting the summit telescopes.
 Ecology and management
Office of Mauna Kea Management. Plan for land management.
Mauna Kea Ice Age Reserve. Department of Land and Natural Resources.

Volcanoes of the Island of Hawaii
Mountains of Hawaii
National Natural Landmarks in Hawaii
Highest points of U.S. states
Inactive volcanoes
Sacred mountains
Shield volcanoes of the United States
Hawaiian words and phrases
Polygenetic shield volcanoes
Pleistocene shield volcanoes
Holocene shield volcanoes
Pleistocene Oceania
Holocene Oceania
Cenozoic Hawaii
Four-thousanders of Hawaii
Hawaiian religion